The Upper Prespa dialect is a member of the western subgroup of the western group of dialects of Macedonian. The dialect is spoken in the town of Resen and surrounding areas. The Upper Prespa dialect is very similar to the Lower Prespa dialect and the Ohrid dialect.

Morphological characteristics
use of the suffix -ој instead of -ови in plurals
use of all three definite articles

Dialects of the Macedonian language
Resen Municipality